Simon Straudi (born 27 January 1999) is an Italian professional footballer who plays as a right-back or attacking midfielder for Austrian club Austria Klagenfurt.

Career
Born in Bruneck in the Italian autonomous province of South Tyrol, Straudi started his career with local side F.C. Südtirol of the Italian third division, making the bench on two occasions at the age of 17.

In 2016, he signed for SV Werder Bremen in the Bundesliga.

In 2020, Straudi moved on loan to Austrian second division club Austria Klagenfurt.

On 7 July 2022, Straudi returned to Austria Klagenfurt on a two-year contract.

Personal life
His brother, Fabian, also plays for Werder Bremen.

References

External links
 

Living people
1999 births
People from Bruneck
Association football wingers
Association football midfielders
Association football defenders
Italian footballers
SV Werder Bremen II players
SK Austria Klagenfurt players
Regionalliga players
2. Liga (Austria) players
Austrian Football Bundesliga players
Italian expatriate footballers
Italian expatriate sportspeople in Germany
Expatriate footballers in Germany
Italian expatriate sportspeople in Austria
Expatriate footballers in Austria